The Maniac Latin Disciples Nation is a Hispanic street gang in Chicago and one of the largest in the Folks Nation alliance. Originally known as the Latin Scorpions, the gang was founded by Albert "Hitler" Hernandez and other Puerto Rican teenagers in the Humboldt Park community in approximately 1966.

Latin Disciples are one of the original gangs in the Folk alliance, alongside the BGD’s (Black Gangster Disciples), Simon City Royals, Spanish Cobras, Satan’s Disciples, Ashland Vikings, Two-Six, and others. 
Around 1993-94 the various gangs in the Maniac Familia, led by the Manic Latin Disciples (MLD’s) began having violent conflicts with their Folk allies in the Insane Familia and Almighty Family which would eventually lead to an all out war on the North & West sides. In 1995, the Maniac Latin Disciples began to spread their influence into the south side of Chicago, specifically in the Gage Park neighborhood, along with several Chicago suburbs. As of 2010, the south side Maniac Latin Disciples set no longer operate in Gage Park and has then moved their operations to the West Elsdon neighborhood.

History
The gang originated as a club of Puerto Rican kids in the mid-1960’s. They were constantly harassed and attacked by resident street gangs, such as the Simon City Royals, Gaylords and Harrison Gents. The Latin Disciples began to fight back to protect themselves. They turned into a full-fledged gang in 1966. A junior high boy named Albert "Hitler" Hernandez would position himself as ‘King’ of the new adolescent gang.             

As the gang members grew up and went to high school, they became active in heavy fighting on the street. And with that, arrests followed. Around 1970, Latin Disciples doing time in prison established a business relationship with the Black Gangster Disciples (today split into the Black Disciples and Gangster Disciples).

Albert “King Hitler” Hernandez was killed at 18 years old in 1972 by two Latin Kings after asking them to remove their gang colors while walking through Latin Disciple’s turf. This ended in a brawl with those Latin Kings, and Hernandez being stabbed to death. From then on the Latin Disciples Nation went to war with the Latin Kings.

The Latin Disciples' first corner was Hirsch & Rockwell. Then they opened up shop on the infamous drug spot Potomac & Rockwell known as “The Twilight Zone”. The gang’s power increased with their domination of the illegal heroin trade during the mid-late 70’s. Latin Disciples spread throughout Humboldt Park at Washtenaw & Hirsch and Talman & Wabansia “T-Dub”. In 1976 Division & Avers opened in West Humboldt Park and in ‘77 the Kedzie & Barry set opened in Logan Square and quickly branched out. This caused increased resentment among Latin Kings and Insane Unknown Kings who’s territory was getting encroached on. A year later the Latin Disciple President of KB was gunned down by Insane Unknowns. 

The Latin Disciples Nation joined the "Folks Alliance" of gangs in 1978, becoming enemies of all People Nations like the Black P Stones, PR Stones, Spanish Lords, Vice Lords and Latin Kings whom the MLD’s already hated.  With the Latin Disciples joining Folks, the Spanish Cobras, Imperial Gangsters, and Latin Eagles immediately followed due to the United Latino Organization they had on the street.

After a major police drug bust took down many ULO sets, including the Latin Disciple leadership, Fernando "Fernie D” Zayas became Prince of the gang in 1979. He led the gang on the streets hard, but has been in Illinois Department of Corrections custody since 1983 for his organizing and participating in the drive-by murders of three Insane Unknowns. Prince Fernie ran the gang from inside prison for over a decade. 

In 1983, the Latin Disciples officially became the Maniac Latin Disciples. During the 80’s, MLD sets opened in the Hermosa neighborhood on Keystone & Dickens and at Kenneth & Belden. 
Albert "Chino D" Ojeda attempted to become a major drug dealer in the gang during this time, and that sparked a violent battle with, among others, his former gang affiliates, Chicago Police said. Chino D was shot and left a paraplegic. From his wheelchair he continued to run his drug operation. A friend who was killed in 1988 and his crew would chauffeur him around the Humboldt Park area in a van, the wheelchair wedged in the back. 

In response to the Spanish Cobra’s “Insane Familia” alliance formed in 1992 of YLOC’s, Insane O-A’s, Ashland Vikings, Insane Dragons and others, the Maniac Latin Disciples formed the "Maniac familia”. Among the initial gangs to join were the YLO-Disciples, Latin Jivers, Latin Lovers and Milwaukee Kings Nation. 
The Campbell Boys Nation split up, half turned Maniac Campbell Boys and half turned Insane Campbell Boys. The Latin Lovers left the Maniac family in 1995 and turned Insane. MKN left a few years later after complaining of being taxed too much. After fighting together as strong allies for 20 years, the Maniac Latin Disciples and Insane Spanish Cobras went to permanent war. 

By the mid-1990s the MLD’s were one of the largest and most organized gangs in the city. But a couple money making street corners caused problems within the gang itself. A desire to control profitable drug corners caused a renegade faction of Maniac Latin Disciples called  “The Bums” to attack their own gang at another section. This conflict was made famous on the History Channel's tv show “Gangland”, describing the Maniac Latin Disciple civil war that resulted in the murder their leader, Enrique “Prince Rick Dog” Garcia, who was sitting in his car when he was ambushed and shot to death. 
The MLD civil war ended by ‘98, but the internal damage was already done. Police raids in the early 2000’s decimated the rest of the MLD leadership. Today the gang currently remains large on the Northwest Side, but never regained its previous power. 

Maniac Latin Disciples eventually spread to different states such as Wisconsin, Tennessee, Michigan, Ohio, and Texas. Subsets of the gang exist in cities such as Antioch, Tn; Nashville, Tn; Memphis, Tn; Milwaukee, WI; Dallas, Tx and Houston, Tx. At one point the gang was heavily involved with the prison Spanish Gangster Disciples unity of Latino Folks inside, which is different than the street gang SGDN, whose founding members were former Maniac Latin Disciples.

Identifiers
Maniac Latin Disciples display black and baby blue colors. Identifiers include a heart with a devil's tail and horns, a hooded character called the Reaper Monk, swastika, crossed swords facing up, and pitchforks facing up. Another common identifier among Maniac Latin Disciples is use of a blackletter font D for the Disciples alliance, similar to that of the Detroit Tigers "D" logo.

References 

Organizations established in 1966
1966 establishments in Illinois
Latino street gangs
Hispanic-American gangs
Folk Nation
Gangs in Chicago
Hispanic and Latino American culture in Chicago